Ukrkosmos is a state-owned operator of satellite telecommunication systems in Ukraine, founded in 1996.

Statutory tasks 
 satellite uplink services
 DTH services
 state technical policy in the field of satellite telecommunication technologies; 
 creation and operation of the Unified Satellite Information System (ЄССПІ); 
 operator of the satellite television and radio network, internet broadcasting, Inmarsat mobile satellite communications, corporate and departmental information transmission networks;
 scientific activity in the field of natural and technical sciences;
 space activities on a commercial basis.

Management 
From May 1998, the company was headed by Olexander Makarov.

On 10 September 2010, Serhiy Kapshtyk became general director.

Current CEO is Nazaruk Ivan.

References

Links 
 Ukrkosmos website
Ukrainian companies established in 1996
Telecommunications companies of Ukraine
State Space Agency of Ukraine